Attica is a fine-dining restaurant in Melbourne, Australia, owned and operated by Ben Shewry. It has won several awards in Australia, and has been included in The World's 50 Best Restaurants since 2010. Its current position on the list places it as the top restaurant in Australia.

The restaurant was opened by Dr David Maccora (an emergency doctor at Malvern's Cabrini Hospital) and his wife Helen, in a converted suburban bank building. After two chefs failed to attract sufficient patronage at the restaurant the Maccoras employed Ben Shewry (formerly at St Kilda's Circa) in 2005, giving him full creative control of the menu. In January 2015 the Maccoras sold the restaurant to Shewry.

See also

List of restaurants in Australia

References

External links

2006 establishments in Australia
Australian cuisine
Restaurants established in 2006
Restaurants in Melbourne
Buildings and structures in the City of Port Phillip